Cydia storeella is a moth of the family Tortricidae. It was first described by Lord Walsingham in 1907. It is endemic to the Hawaiian island of Maui.

It is known only from a single female and is possibly extinct. It might also be just a form of Cydia plicatum.

External links

Species info

Grapholitini
Endemic moths of Hawaii